Araphura is a genus of malacostracan crustacean found in New Zealand.

Species 
According to the World Register of Marine Species, the following species are accepted within Araphura:

 Araphura arvedlundi Larsen & Araújo-Silva, 2009
 Araphura breviaria Dojiri & Sieg, 1997
 Araphura brevimanus (Lilljeborg, 1864) 
 Araphura curticauda Larsen, 2005
 Araphura cuspirostris Dojiri & Sieg, 1997
 Araphura doutagalla Błażewicz-Paszkowycz & Bamber, 2012
 Araphura elongata (Shiino, 1970) 
 Araphura extensa Larsen, 2003
 Araphura filiformis (Lilljeborg, 1864) 
 Araphura higginsi Sieg & Dojiri, 1989
 Araphura io Bamber, 2005
 Araphura joubinensis Sieg & Dojiri, 1989
 Araphura macrobelone Błażewicz-Paszkowycz, Bamber & Cunha, 2011
 Araphura parabrevimanus (Lang, 1968) 
 Araphura pygmothymos Błażewicz-Paszkowycz & Bamber, 2012
 Araphura rectifrons (Kudinova-Pasternak, 1973) 
 Araphura spinithenari Larsen, 2005
 Araphura studens Blazewicz & Debiec, 2017
 Araphura whakarakaia Bird, 2011
 Araphura yarra Błażewicz-Paszkowycz & Bamber, 2012

References 

Tanaidacea
Marine crustaceans of New Zealand
Crustaceans described in 1984